Michel Charles-Émile Trudeau (October 2, 1975 – November 13, 1998) was the youngest son of Canadian Prime Minister Pierre Trudeau and Margaret Trudeau and the younger brother of current Prime Minister Justin Trudeau. He died in an avalanche on November 13, 1998, while skiing in Kokanee Glacier Provincial Park.

Biography 
He was born at the Ottawa Civic Hospital in Ottawa, Ontario, and partially named after his paternal grandfather, Charles-Émile. Trudeau was known to family and friends as Miche, and he later started going by Mike. Trudeau lived his early life in Ottawa and later Montreal upon his father's retirement from politics in 1984, where he was a classmate of Sophie Grégoire. During their summer breaks, Michel and his brothers attended Camp Ahmek on Canoe Lake in Algonquin Provincial Park where he would later work as a camp counsellor. He studied at Collège Jean-de-Brébeuf before attending Dalhousie University to study microbiology. When talking about her sons each having distinctly different personalities in an interview in 1977, Margaret Trudeau said, "Justin, 6, is a prince — a very good little boy. Sasha (Alexandre), born Christmas Day, 1973, is a bit of a revolutionary, very determined and strong-willed. Miche (Michel) is a happy, well-adjusted child, who combined the best traits of both brothers."

Death
Trudeau died as the result of an avalanche on Friday November 13, 1998, aged 23. At the time, he had been working for about a year at Red Mountain Resort and living in Rossland, British Columbia. He was taking a backcountry skiing trip with some friends in Kokanee Glacier Provincial Park when he was swept into Kokanee Lake and unable to reach the shore. His companions were unable to effect a rescue, and Trudeau drowned. An extensive search was launched, but his body has never been found. The lake's high altitude and limited days of open waters each year prevented divers from completing the search. The Trudeau family called off the recovery and later built a chalet nearby as a memorial to their youngest son.

A varietal of rose discovered by Betsy Dening, a British Columbia horticulturist and Trudeau's aunt, debuted at the World Rose Festival in 2010 as the "Michel Trudeau Memorial Rosebush". Sales of the rosebush benefit the Canadian Avalanche Foundation.

References

1975 births
1998 deaths
Children of prime ministers of Canada
Dalhousie University alumni
French Quebecers
Deaths in avalanches
Natural disaster deaths in Canada
Michel
Canadian people of Dutch descent
Canadian people of English descent
Canadian people of French descent
Canadian people of Malaysian descent
Canadian people of Indonesian descent
Canadian people of Scottish descent
People from Ottawa
Pierre Trudeau
Skiing deaths
Sport deaths in Canada